Hybosida dauban is a species of spider found on Silhouette Island in the Seychelles.

References

Spiders described in 1979
Spiders of Africa
Fauna of Seychelles
Palpimanidae